Kaptama is a settlement in Kenya's Bungoma County.

References 

Populated places in Rift Valley Province
Bungoma County